The Best Kept Secret festival is a three-day music festival held inside the Safaripark Beekse Bergen, within the village of Hilvarenbeek in the south of the Netherlands, since 2013.

Best Kept Secret is a music festival with a line-up in which big names are alternated with new discoveries from indie, folk, hip-hop, rock, electronics or a mixture of styles. The festival's centerpiece is a lake at the back of Beekse Bergen safari park. The festival's founder described his vision as aiming to create "something that we’d like to go to ourselves".

Best Kept Secret festival has one open air stage (ONE), three tent stages (TWO, FIVE and SEVEN) and two dance floor stages: THREE and FOUR. For the 2017 edition Best Kept Secret added 'The Casbah', a dive bar and hang-out, that hosts performances of hardcore bands. For the 2019 edition Best Kept Secret added SEVEN, a smaller tent stage for experimental performers.

History 
The festival is organized by Dutch booking agency Friendly Fire.

In June 2013 the first edition was held, and sold-out each day with 15,000 visitors.

The festival has been nominated twice at the European Festival Awards: 
 Best Festival Line-Up 2014
 Best Medium-Sized Festival 2014 
In 2013 the festival won the 'Best Festival Award' at the 'IJzeren Podiumdieren' award show at Eurosonic Noorderslag. The 'IJzeren Podiumdieren' award show is an initiative by the Vereniging Nederlandse Poppodia- en Festivals (Dutch venues and festivals association).

Best Kept Secret festival introduced 'the food line-up' for their first edition. The festival organization strives for diverse and sustainable food options, including vegetarian meals, soup and juices.

Editions

2013

2014

2015 

In total, around 95 artists, bands and DJ's performed at Best Kept Secret festival 2015.

2016 

In total, around 100 artists, bands and DJ's performed at Best Kept Secret festival 2016.

2017

2018

2019

References

Sources

External links
 Official website

Music festivals in the Netherlands
Music festivals established in 2013
2013 establishments in the Netherlands
Hilvarenbeek